Joseph Robert Loscalzo (July 18, 1910 – October 19, 1955), known professionally as Midget Wolgast, was a world flyweight boxing champion. Wolgast turned pro in 1925 and was considered one of the fastest boxers of all time. In 1930, he defeated Black Bill for the vacant New York State Athletic Commission world flyweight title.  The Ring Magazine founder Nat Fleischer, Statistical boxing website BoxRec, and the International Boxing Research Organization all rate Wolgast as the 8th greatest flyweight of all-time. He has been elected to the International Boxing Hall of Fame and the Helms Boxing Hall of Fame.

Wolgast fought future NYSAC Bantamweight Champion Tony Marino for the first time on June 6, 1932, at the Myers Bowl in North Braddock, Pennsylvania, winning in a ten-round points decision.

Professional boxing record
All information in this section is derived from BoxRec, unless otherwise stated.

Official Record

All newspaper decisions are officially regarded as “no decision” bouts and are not counted in the win/loss/draw column.

Unofficial record

Record with the inclusion of newspaper decisions in the win/loss/draw column.

References

External links
 
 CBZ Biography - Midget Wolgast
 IBHOF Bio - Midget Wolgast

|-

 

1910 births
1955 deaths
Boxers from Philadelphia
International Boxing Hall of Fame inductees
American male boxers
Flyweight boxers